The Plaza de Isabel II (also known as Plaza de Ópera) is a historic public square between the Sol and Palacio wards in the central district of Madrid. It was formed by filling the ravine created by the Arenal stream and the source of the Fountain of the Canals of the Pear Tree. The square occupies part of the site where the old  stood between 1738 and 1817.

The Teatro Real opera house, which sits on the western edge of the plaza, was ordered to be constructed by Isabel II for whom the plaza is now named.

Background 
Between the 15th and 18th centuries, this space was known as the "Caños del Peral" and is thought to be the source of the Walls del Arrabal. 

These gullies would be later filled during the reign of Isabel II when the Royal Theater was built.

A year later, the statue was taken down and placed in the Royal Theater. It was replaced by an allegorical sculpture of Comedy by sculptor Francisco Elías Vallejo. The statue of Isabel II was returned to the square in 1905.

Fountain of the Canals of the Pear Tree 

In Pedro Teixeira's 1656 work , the Fountain of the Canals of the Pear Tree appears. A spring that supplied the primitive medieval "qanats" and as a water source for the royal palace was covered over in 1809. Eventually, the entire area was developed, filling in the area around the Arenal ravine. The area facing the Royal Palace was also developed and is now the Plaza de Oriente. The fountain was rediscovered in 1990 with the remodeling of the Ópera station of the Line 2 of the Madrid Metro.

In film 
In 1980, the plaza was featured in the opening scene of the Fernando Trueba film Ópera prima.

References

Further reading

External links 

Plazas in the Palacio neighborhood, Madrid